SolarEdge is an Israeli company that develops and sells solar inverters for photovoltaic arrays, energy generation monitoring software, battery energy storage products, as well as other related products and services to residential, commercial and industrial customers. Established in 2006, the company also has offices in Germany, Italy, Japan, and United States. It is incorporated in Delaware. The company was the first to successfully commercialize power optimizers, a device that offers module-level maximum power point tracking (MPPT), before feeding back the electricity generated into a central inverter.

History 
SolarEdge was established in 2006 by Guy Sella, Lior Handelsman, Yoav Galin, Meir Adest and Amir Fishelov. The company was backed by venture capital from GE Energy Financial Services, Norwest Venture Partners, Lightspeed Venture Partners, ORR Partners, Genesis Partners, Walden International, Vertex Ventures Israel, JP Asia Capital and Opus Capital Ventures.

The company started mass production of its products by contract manufacturer Flex at the end of 2009.

In March 2015, SolarEdge had an initial public offering of 7,000,000 shares of its common stock at a price to the public of $18.00 per share, raising $126 million. The shares began trading on the NASDAQ Global Select Market under the ticker symbol “SEDG.” Goldman Sachs and Deutsche Bank acted as joint book-running managers for the offering.

In May 2015, SolarEdge partnered with Tesla Energy to develop an inverter that could charge the Tesla Powerwall home energy storage battery that was unveiled in April 2015. The SolarEdge inverter manages both the conversion of energy from solar panels along with charging and discharging of the Powerwall. Over time, Tesla phased out its partnership with SolarEdge, with Tesla adding an inverter to its Powerwall 2 that was introduced in October 2016, and introducing its own solar inverter in January 2021

In October 2018, SolarEdge announced agreements to acquire a major stake in Kokam, a South Korean provider of Lithium-ion battery cells, batteries and energy storage solutions. In January 2019 SolarEdge announced the acquisition of a majority stake in SMRE – an Italian EV powertrain manufacturer. In 2019 SolarEdge announced the acquisition of Gamatronic, a UPS manufacturer, and established its Critical Power division

Following a battle with cancer, founder Guy Sella died in 2019. Former vice president of global sales Zvi Lando, was appointed as CEO.

Technology 
Many solar photovoltaic systems use a central inverter, where the panels are connected together in a series creating a string, which delivers all the direct current (DC) power produced into the inverter for conversion into grid-compatible alternating current (AC). The major drawback to this approach is that maximum power point tracking (MPPT) is performed for the entire string, therefore production is limited by the output of the lowest-performing panel. Performance can be impacted by shading and weather conditions.

SolarEdge addresses this problem with power optimizers, small devices placed behind each individual solar panel that offers module-level MPPT, before feeding the energy to a central inverter. Power optimizers also allow panel-level monitoring of energy production, instead of total or string level data provided by traditional central inverters.

See also 
 Solar inverter
 Photovoltaic system
 Photovoltaics
 List of photovoltaics companies
 Solar energy

References

External links 
 

Photovoltaic inverter manufacturers
Companies listed on the Nasdaq
Information technology companies of the United States
Solar energy companies of the United States
2015 initial public offerings